Kufic script is a style of Arabic script that gained prominence early on as a preferred script for Quran transcription and architectural decoration, and it has since become a reference and an archetype for a number of other Arabic scripts. It developed from the Arabic alphabet in the city of Kufa, from which its name is derived. Kufic script is characterized by angular, rectilinear letterforms and its horizontal orientation. There are many different versions of Kufic script, such as square Kufic, floriated Kufic, knotted Kufic, and others. The artistic styling of Kufic led to its use in a non-Arabic context in Europe, as decoration on architecture, known as pseudo-Kufic.

History

Origin of the Kufic script 
Calligraphers in the early Islamic period used a variety of methods to transcribe Quran manuscripts. Arabic calligraphy became one of the most important branches of Islamic Art. Calligraphers came out with the new style of writing called Kufic. Kufic is the oldest calligraphic form of the various Arabic scripts. The name of the script derives from Kufa, a city in southern Iraq which was considered as an intellectual center within the early Islamic period. Kufic is defined as a highly angular form of the Arabic alphabet originally used in early copies of the Quran. Sheila S. Blair suggests that "the name Kufic was introduced to Western scholarship by Jacob George Christian Adler (1756–1834)". Furthermore, the Kufic script plays an important role in the development of Islamic calligraphy. In fact, "it is the first style of Islamic period writings in which the manifestation of art, delicacy and beauty are explicitly evident", says Salwa Ibraheem Tawfeeq Al-Amin. The rule set for this writing was about the angular, linear shapes of the characters. In fact, "the rules that were defined at the outset of the Kufic tradition essentially remained the same throughout its lifespan", says Alain George.

Usage of Kufic script 

The Quran was first written in a plain, slanted, and uniform script but, when its content was formalized, a script that denoted authority emerged. This coalesced into what is now known as Primary Kufic script. Kufic was prevalent in manuscripts from the 7th to 10th centuries. Around the 8th century, it was the most important of several variants of Arabic scripts with its austere and fairly low vertical profile and a horizontal emphasis. Until about the 11th century it was the main script used to copy the Quran. Professional copyists employed a particular form of Kufic for reproducing the earliest surviving copies of the Quran, which were written on parchment and date from the 8th to 10th centuries. It is distinguished from Thuluth script in its use of decorative elements whereas the latter was designed to avoid decorative motifs. In place of the decorations in Kufic scripts, Thuluth used vowels.

Characteristics of Kufic script 

The main characteristic of the Kufic script "appears to be the transformation of the ancient cuneiform script into the Arabic letters", according to Enis Timuçin Tan. Moreover, it was characterized by figural letters that were shaped in a way to be nicely written on parchment, building and decorative objects like lusterware and coins. Kufic script is composed of geometrical forms like straight lines and angles along with verticals and horizontals. Originally, Kufic did not have what is known as a differentiated consonant, which means, for example, that the letters "t", "b", and "th" were not distinguished by diacritical marks and looked the same. However, it is still used in Islamic countries. In later Kufic Qurans of the ninth and early tenth century, "the sura headings were more often designed with the sura title as the main feature, often written in gold, with a palmette extending into the margin", comments Marcus Fraser. Its use in transcribing manuscripts has been important in the development of Kufic Script. Earlier kufic was written on manuscripts with precision which contributed to its development. For instance, "the precision achieved in practice is all more remarkable because Kufic manuscripts were not ruled", says Alain George. Moreover, he explains that Kufic manuscripts were laid out with a stable number of lines per page, and these were strictly parallel and equidistant. One impressive example of an early Quran manuscript, known as the Blue Quran, features gold Kufic script on parchment dyed with indigo. It is commonly attributed to the early Fatimid or Abbasid court. The main text of this Quran is written in gold ink, thus the effect on looking at the manuscript is of gold on blue. According to Marcus Fraser, "the political and artistic sophistication and financial expense of the production of the Blue Quran could only have been contemplated and achieved by a ruler of considerable power and wealth".

Ornamental use of Kufic script 
The Kufic script is inscribed on textiles, coins, lusterware, building and so on. Coins were very important in the development of the Kufic script. In fact, "the letter strokes on coins, had become perfectly straight, with curves tending toward geometrical circularity by 86", observes Alain George.  As an example, Kufic is commonly seen on Seljuk coins and monuments and on early Ottoman coins. Its decorative character led to its use as a decorative element in several public and domestic buildings constructed prior to the Republican period in Turkey. Also, the current flag of Iraq (2008) also includes a kufic rendition of the takbir.

Similarly, the flag of Iran (1980) has the takbir  written in white square kufic script a total of 22 times on the fringe of both the green and red bands. Kufic inscriptions were important in the emergence of textiles too, often functioning as decoration in the form of tiraz bands. According to Maryam Ekhtiar, "tiraz inscriptions were written in Kufic or floriated Kufic script, and later, in naskhi or throughout the islamic world". Those inscriptions include the name of God or the ruler. As an example, the inscription inside the Dome of the Rock is written in Kufic. Square or geometric Kufic is a very simplified rectangular style widely used for tiling. In Iran sometimes entire buildings are covered with tiles spelling sacred names like those of God, Muhammad and Ali in square Kufic, a technique known as banna'i. Moreover, there is "Pseudo-Kufic", also "Kufesque", which refers to imitations of the Kufic script, made in a non-Arabic context, during the Middle Ages or the Renaissance: "Imitations of Arabic in European art are often described as pseudo-Kufic, borrowing the term for an Arabic script that emphasizes straight and angular strokes, and is most commonly used in Islamic architectural decoration".

Square Kufic 
Square Kufic, also sometimes known as banna'i ("masonry" script), is a bare Arabic writing form that developed in the 12th century. Square Kufic was originally created in Iranian architecture with bricks and tiles functioning as pixels. Legibility is not a priority of this script.

The Syrian calligrapher Mamoun Sakkal described its development as an "exceptional step towards simplification in Kufic styles that evolved towards more complexity in the preceding centuries". 

In recent years, this calligraphy form has been receiving more popularity for use in ornaments (such as in decorated clocks, frames, stickers), logos (that usually implies Islamic enterprises in government and private sectors), and even in freestyle Arabic calligraphy competitions. There has been a disciplined approach of creating Square Kufic calligraphy. This controlled method of creation preserved basic and accurate features of Arabic letters with little compromises, if any. A finished work can then be qualitatively judged rather than only appreciated as an abstract piece.

Configurations 
While there are no restriction to formats that Square Kufic should be written in, Square Kufic can be categorized into 3 most commonly used configurations.

Free Flow 
The normal writing format using pixelated Arabic font. The overall shape is not limited by any shape or boundary. Although this configuration is straight forward, it is not used for most Square Kufic-related work, due to its less aesthetic appearance relative to the other configurations.

Free flow is mainly used as baseline before developed into more sophisticated configurations.

Linear 
Just like free flow, the writing goes from right to left but within a justified height that conforms into a continuous rectangle. The letters including their respective dots must only leave 1 pixel apart from each other.

Linear is preferred to write long scriptures such as Quranic verses along the interior perimeter or broken into lines elegantly against mosque walls.

Spiral 
While the name suggests a radial or circular form, they are usually presented in a square or rectangular shape. The 1 pixel space applies between the letters here as well. The major differences between a linear and a spiral Square Kufic calligraphy are

 Spiral has a minimum of two and up to four datums; linear only has a single datum, and
 Spiral allows letters to integrate at each corner of adjacent datums and across lines, and is only bounded by their outermost perimeter; linear letters maintain their original height even if they are warped into a spiral.

This configuration is used as a design centerpiece in buildings for shorter scriptures, name design commissions, and logos.

Other 
Square Kufic calligraphy is by no means limited to the above configurations. There are many forms that are creative iterations or independent from these formats.

Gallery

Kufic script in Qurans

Kufic script elsewhere

Typefaces 
Google Fonts:
 Noto Kufi Arabic
 Changa
 Reem Kufi
 Cairo
 Almarai
 Mada
 Kufam

Windows:
 Andalus

iOS:
 Diwan Kufi

Sample text from the Universal Declaration of Human Rights, article 1:
 يولد جميع الناس أحرارًا متساوين في الكرامة والحقوق. وقد وهبوا عقلاً وضميرًا وعليهم أن يعامل بعضهم بعضًا بروح الإخاء.

See also 

 Ancient North Arabian script
 Ancient South Arabian script
 Hijazi script
 Maghrebi script
 Mashq script
 Muhaqqaq
 Naskh
 Persian calligraphy
 Rayhan
 Tawqi
 Thuluth

Citations

General references 
 Kosack, Wolfgang: Islamische Schriftkunst des Kufischen. Geometrisches Kufi in 593 Schriftbeispielen. Deutsch – Kufi – Arabisch. Christoph Brunner, Basel 2014, .
 Mack, Rosamond E. Bazaar to Piazza: Islamic Trade and Italian Art, 1300–1600, University of California Press, 2001,

External links 

 Square Kufic lectures: alphabet (stylized), examples, square designs
 Kufic manuscript alphabet
 On the Origins of the Kufic Script
 Kufic Script
 Square Kufic Script
 Square Kufic
 Square Kufic explained

Arabic calligraphy
Arabic art